is a Japanese screenwriter and novelist. He is a graduate of Waseda University, School of Human Sciences.

Ōkouchi is best known for collaborating with director Gorō Taniguchi for composing the story and script of the Sunrise original production, Code Geass: Lelouch of the Rebellion in 2006 and its sequel Code Geass: Lelouch of the Rebellion R2 in 2008.

Works

Anime television series
Turn A Gundam (Episodic screenplay; 1999–2000)
Angelic Layer (Series composition, screenplay; 2001)
Project ARMS (Episodic screenplay; 2001)
Overman King Gainer (Series composition, screenplay; 2002)
Azumanga Daioh (Series composition, screenplay; 2002)
RahXephon (Episodic screenplay; 2002)
Wolf’s Rain (Episodic screenplay; 2003)
Stellvia (Episodic screenplay; 2003)
Planetes (Series composition, screenplay; 2003–2004)
Mahou Sensei Negima! (Series composition, screenplay; 2005)
Eureka Seven (Episodic screenplay; 2005)
Code Geass: Lelouch of the Rebellion (Original story, series composition, screenplay; 2006–2007)
Code Geass: Lelouch of the Rebellion R2 (Original story, series composition, screenplay; 2008)
Shigofumi: Letters from the Departed (Series composition, screenplay; 2008)
Guilty Crown (Assistant series composition, episodic screenplay; 2011–2012)
Valvrave the Liberator (Series composition, screenplay; 2013)
M3: The Dark Metal (Episodic screenplay; 2014)
Space Dandy (Screenplay for Episode 5; 2014)
Black Butler: Book of Circus (2014)
Comet Lucifer (Episodic screenplay; 2015)
Heavy Object (Episodic screenplay; 2015–2016)
Kabaneri of the Iron Fortress (Series composition, screenplay; 2016)
Princess Principal (Series composition, screenplay for Episodes 1 to 10; 2017)
Devilman Crybaby (Series composition, screenplay; 2018)
Hakumei and Mikochi (Screenplay for Episodes 4 and 7; 2018)
Lupin the Third Part 5 (Series composition, screenplay; 2018)
SK8 the Infinity (Series composition; 2021–present)
Mobile Suit Gundam: The Witch from Mercury (Series composition, screenplay; 2022)

Anime films
 Brave Story (2006)
 Magic Tree House (2011)
 Berserk: The Golden Age Arc 
 I: The Egg of the King (2012)
 II: The Battle for Doldrey (2012)
 III: The Advent (2013)
 Code Geass: Lelouch of the Rebellion 
 I: Initiation (2017)
 II: Transgression  (2018)
 III: Glorification (2018)
 Code Geass Lelouch of the Re;surrection (2019)
 Fuse Teppō Musume no Torimonochō (2019)
 Seven Days War (2019)
 Sing a Bit of Harmony (Co-writer; 2021)

OVA
 The 08th MS Team: Battle in Three Dimensions (2013)
 SK8 the Infinity (TBA)

ONA
 Lupin Zero (2022)

Novels
Revolutionary Girl Utena 1: Ao no Sōjo (1998)
Revolutionary Girl Utena 2: Midori no Omoi (1998)
Martian Successor Nadesico: Ruri no Kōkai Nisshi (1998)
Martian Successor Nadesico: Channel ha Ruriruri De (1998)
Martian Successor Nadesico: Ruri A Kara B he no Monogatari (1999)
Mobile Suit Gundam: The 08th MS Team (1999)
Cyber Team in Akihabara: Tsubame Hatsu Taiken!? Club Katsudō Sentō Chū (1999)
Starbows (2001)
A Little Snow Fairy Sugar (2002)

Sources:

References

External links
 

Sunrise (company) people
1968 births
Living people
Japanese screenwriters
20th-century Japanese novelists
21st-century Japanese novelists
Anime screenwriters
People from Sendai